The 2017 World Junior Speed Skating Championships took place from 17 to 19 February 2017 in Helsinki, Finland. They were the 44th World Junior Speed Skating Championships.

Medal summary

Medal table

Men

Women

References

External links
 Official website
Results

2017
2017 in speed skating
2017 in Finnish sport
International speed skating competitions hosted by Finland
International sports competitions in Helsinki
February 2017 sports events in Europe
2010s in Helsinki
2017 in youth sport